The 2002 James Madison Dukes football team was an American football team that represented James Madison University during the 2002 NCAA Division I-AA football season as a member of the Atlantic 10 Conference. In their fourth year under head coach Mickey Matthews, the team compiled a 5–7 record.

Schedule

References

James Madison
James Madison Dukes football seasons
James Madison Dukes football